Robbie Krieger & Friends is the first solo studio album by Robby Krieger, former guitarist for The Doors. The album was released in 1977. He also designed the album cover art.

Background 
After The Doors disbanded in 1973, Krieger was a member of Butts Band which disbanded in 1975. He then performed solo with a major departure in style. The album received mixed reviews.

Track listing

Side one 
"Gumpopper" (Sal Marquez - Robbie Krieger) - 3:37 
"Uptown" (Robbie Krieger) - 3:54 
"Every Day" (Robbie Krieger) - 5:04 
"Marilyn Monroe" (Robbie Krieger) - 4:55

Side two 
"The Ally" (Sal Marquez - Robbie Krieger) - 6:28 
"Low Bottomy" (Robbie Krieger) - 2:58 
"Spare Change" (Robbie Krieger) - 3:38 
"Big Oak Basin" (Gary Barone) - 4:55

Personnel

Bass – Bob Glaub (track: 8), Ken Wild (tracks: 2,6,7), Reggie McBride (tracks: 1,3,4,7), Sal Marquez (track: 8)
Bongos – Eddie Talamantes (tracks: 7,8)
Clavichord – Ron Stockert (track: 1), Sal Marquez (tracks: 3,5,6,7)
Congas – Perico (tracks: 5,7)
Drums – Bruce Gary (tracks: 2,5,6,7), Ed Greene (tracks: 1,3,4,8), John Densmore (track: 4)
Guitar – Robby Krieger
Organ – Greg Mathieson (tracks: 2,8), Jimmy Smith (track: 4), Stu Goldberg (track:5,6,7)
Piano – Sal Marquez (track: 8)
Saxophone – Joel Peskin (tracks: 1,2,3,5,8), piccolo flute (track: 2)
Synthesizer – Sal Marquez (tracks: 1,4,6,7), Stu Goldberg (tracks: 5,6,7)
Timbales – Eddie Talamantes (track: 5)
Timpani – Bruce Gary (tracks: 2, 7)
Trombone – Jock Ellis (tracks: 1,2,5,8)
Trumpet – Gary Barone (tracks: 5,8), Sal Marquez (tracks: 2,3,5,8)
Vocals – Afreeka Trees (tracks: 2,3,4), Robby Krieger (tracks: 3,4), Sharon Robinson (tracks: 2,3,4)

1977 debut albums
Robby Krieger albums
Blue Note Records albums